The Chinese Ambassador to Yemen was the official representative of the People's Republic of China to the Republic of Yemen.

Due to the Yemeni Civil War (2014–present) in December 2014, by April 2015, China withdrew all their citizens and closed the embassy in Sana'a.

List of representatives

South Yemen 

The Chinese Ambassador to South Yemen was the official representative of the People's Republic of China to People's Democratic Republic of Yemen.

List of representatives (South Yemen)

China–Yemen relations

References 

 
Yemen
China